Charles Gray is an American musician, best known for his tenure as the guitarist for the Orange County rock band The Aquabats, of which he served as a member from 1995 to 2000 under the stage name of Ultra Kyu and later The Mysterious Kyu (pronounced as the letter Q). He also wrote all the songs for The Goodwin Club, a Ska band from Orange County, from 1993 to 1995.

Although Gray was listed as a member of The Aquabats on their 1996 debut album The Return of the Aquabats, he didn't record with the band until their subsequent release, 1997's The Fury of the Aquabats!. Gray remained a member of The Aquabats until his departure in 2000. After Aquabats, Gray continued playing with various bands and is currently pursuing a career in opera in New York.

Discography
The Fury of the Aquabats! (1997) - electric and acoustic guitars, finger cymbals, piano, banjo, EBow, violin, sitar, Mellotron, vocals, Moog synthesizer
The Aquabats vs. the Floating Eye of Death! (1999) - guitar
Myths, Legends and Other Amazing Adventures, Vol. 2 (2000) - guitar

References

American rock guitarists
American male guitarists
The Aquabats members
Year of birth missing (living people)
Living people